The Almon W. and Dr. Mary E. Spaulding Ranch is a  farmstead, originally an  homestead, in Boise, Idaho. The site is named for the Spauldings, who moved from Los Angeles to Boise in 1890 and applied for a homestead in 1893. The Spauldings occupied the site in 1896, constructing the main house in 1905 and the barn in 1910. After Dr. Spaulding's death in 1919, Almon Spaulding continued to reside on the property until 1924.

The site was acquired by the City of Boise in 2016, and it is managed by Boise Parks and Recreation.

The site was added to the National Register of Historic Places in 1994.

Inventory
 House (1905), remodeled in 1910, 1940s, 1950s
 Tenant house, remodeled in 1940s, 1950s
 Barn (1910), altered in 1950s
 Silo (1910)
 Granary (pre 1940)
 Chicken coop (pre 1940)
 Outdoor toilet (pre 1940)
 Sheds (pre 1940)
 Front fence (pre 1920)

See also
 List of parks in Boise

References

External links
 
 Spaulding Ranch Site, Boise Parks and Recreation

		
National Register of Historic Places in Ada County, Idaho
Residential buildings completed in 1905
Boise, Idaho
1905 establishments in Idaho